The silence of the innocent (Samt El Abriyaa) is an Algerian television series, produced and broadcast by Télévision Algérienne, directed by Amare Tribech and written by Samia Kabli. It premiere on May 27, 2017 on Télévision Algérienne, A3 and Canal Algérie.

It stars Sara Lalama, Djamel Aouane, Mohamed Ajaimi, Khadidja Mezini, Meriem Zebiri, Noureddine Boussouf.

Description 
The series is adapted from the Turkish drama scenario, based on a difficult and almost impossible love story between Hanane the rich girl and Omar, because of the family conflicts. This causes Hanan's loss of all her wealth and money.

Cast  
 Sara Lalama as Hanane
 Djamel Aouane as Omar
 Khadidja Mezini
 Mohamed Ajaimi
 Meriem Zebiri
 Noureddine Boussouf
 Kamel Rouini
 Nawel Djada
 Tinhinane 
 Meriem Mimouni 
 Meriem Zebiri

Series overview

References 

Arabic television series
2017 Algerian television series debuts
2010s Algerian television series
Public Establishment of Television original programming